Joseph Berenyi (born November 12, 1968) is an American Paralympic track and road cyclist. He won gold, silver and bronze medals at the 2012 Paralympic Games held in London.

Berenyi was born in Aurora, Illinois in 1968 to Joe and Dolores Berenyi. He was injured in a construction accident leading to him losing his right arm and left knee cap.

References

1968 births
Living people
Sportspeople from Aurora, Illinois
Paralympic cyclists of the United States
Cyclists at the 2012 Summer Paralympics
Cyclists at the 2016 Summer Paralympics
Paralympic gold medalists for the United States
Paralympic silver medalists for the United States
Paralympic bronze medalists for the United States
Medalists at the 2012 Summer Paralympics
Medalists at the 2016 Summer Paralympics
Paralympic medalists in cycling
Medalists at the 2015 Parapan American Games
Medalists at the 2019 Parapan American Games
Cyclists from Illinois
Cyclists at the 2020 Summer Paralympics